Byron Smith (born September 26, 1969) is an American college basketball coach, currently head coach at Prairie View A&M.

Playing career
Smith started off his college career at Northwestern State for one season before transferring to Tyler Junior College, then completing his collegiate career at Houston under Pat Foster, where he was a two-time All-Southwest Conference selection.

After graduation, Smith played professionally in Australia, Turkey, and Greece.

Coaching career
Smith returned to his alma mater as an assistant coach under Clyde Drexler from 1998 to 2000, before joining the staff at Texas Southern for one season. After a one-year assistant coaching stop at McLennan Community College, Smith became the head coach of the Harlem Globetrotters from 2002 to 2003. After his time with the Globetrotters, Smith coached AAU basketball and ran basketball skills camps in the Houston area.

In 2007, Smith returned to the collegiate coaching ranks joining Mark Turgeon's staff at Texas A&M for two seasons, followed by another one-year stint at Texas Southern. He was named an assistant coach at Prairie View A&M under Byron Rimm II. When Rimm resigned on January 26, 2016, Smith was elevated to the interim head coaching position, and subsequently was named the permanent head coach at the conclusion of the season.

Head coaching record

NCAA DI

‡ Rimm II resigned 1/26/16; Smith coached rest of season.

References

Living people
1969 births
American men's basketball coaches
American men's basketball players
Basketball coaches from Louisiana
Basketball players from Louisiana
Harlem Globetrotters coaches
Houston Cougars men's basketball coaches
Houston Cougars men's basketball players
Northwestern State Demons basketball players
Prairie View A&M Panthers basketball coaches
Sportspeople from Bossier City, Louisiana
Texas A&M Aggies men's basketball coaches
Texas Southern Tigers men's basketball coaches
Tyler Apaches men's basketball players